Kerrisdale was a railway station located in Kerrisdale, Victoria, Australia, on the Mansfield line.

The station consisted of a side platform, goods shed and a goods platform and a cattle ramp which was abolished in 1976.

References

Railway stations in Australia opened in 1883
Railway stations closed in 1978
Disused railway stations in Victoria (Australia)
Mansfield railway line